The Midrash of Pseudo-Simon is a medieval text by a kabbalistic scholar.

References

Kabbalah